Katy Herron (born 13 July 1989) is an Australian rules footballer who played for Western Bulldogs in the AFL Women's (AFLW). In June 2021, she was delisted by the club after spending the 2021 AFL Women's season on the inactive list.

References

External links

 

Living people
1989 births
Donegal ladies' Gaelic footballers
Western Bulldogs (AFLW) players
Irish female players of Australian rules football
Ladies' Gaelic footballers who switched code